John Jeffrey (1751 – 18 May 1822) was an English politician who was an MP for Poole in Dorset from 1796 to 1809.

Life 
Jeffrey was Mayor of Poole in 1798.

He served in the last Parliament of Great Britain and the First Parliament of the United Kingdom.

He died in Lisbon, Portugal in 1822 and was buried in the British Cemetery there.

References 

1751 births
1822 deaths
British MPs 1796–1800
UK MPs 1801–1802
UK MPs 1802–1806
UK MPs 1807–1812
People from Poole
English Quakers
Mayors of Poole
Burials at the British Cemetery, Lisbon